The 1998 United States House of Representatives elections in Virginia were held on November 3, 1998, to determine who will represent the Commonwealth of Virginia in the United States House of Representatives. Virginia has eleven seats in the House, apportioned according to the 1990 United States Census. Representatives are elected for two-year terms.

Overview

References

See also

 United States House elections, 1998

Virginia
1998
1998 Virginia elections